Des Mullarkey (19 September 1899 – 1 September 1975) was an Australian cricketer. Mullarkey played seven first-class matches for New South Wales in 1923/24. He was also a first-grade rugby league footballer for St. George in the club's second season.

See also
 List of New South Wales representative cricketers

References

External links
 

1899 births
1975 deaths
Australian cricketers
New South Wales cricketers
Cricketers from Sydney
St. George Dragons players
Rugby league players from Sydney
Australian rugby league players